Forced sterilization in Peru was part of a larger effort variably described as the ethnic cleansing or genocide of indigenous peoples of Peru that occurred under the government of Alberto Fujimori through his National Population Program, with the such projects first being outlined in the Plan Verde of the Peruvian Armed Forces. More than 300,000 Peruvians – the majority impoverished or indigenous women – were forcibly sterilized during the Fujimori administration. The project received foreign support from the Nippon Foundation, the United Nations and the United States. The generational shift from the sterilizations resulted with the decimation of rural economies and increased poverty in those regions.

Background 
Population control measures, especially relating to ethnicity, began to appear during the 20th century in Peru. The elites of Peru adopted the theory of eugenics in the 1920s and 1930s, requiring pre-marriage examinations that would ban unions that involved individuals determined to be "unfit". In the 1930s, the Peruvian government actively promoted the immigration of white Europeans.

Modern concerns over population control in Peru after the eugenics movements of the 1930's and 40's stemmed from rapid demographic changes. The population began to urbanize quickly and improvements in healthcare led to mortality declines, while birth rates remained stable at around six children per woman in 1972. As the sexual revolution progressed in the United States and abroad, there came calls for increased access to birth control methods among women in Peru. While feminist groups were active in advocating for the middle class, mostly urban women of the time, class and ethnicity were a factor in this movement. Female activists of the middle class had much better access to birth control methods and reproductive health services than poor, rural, largely indigenous women. After the collapse of the military regime in the 1980's, the first attempts at widening access to birth control were made under the administration of Fernando Belaúnde. The 1981 census showed that the average birth rate remained just above five children per woman, and that those living in areas with the highest birth rates did not want more children. The administration established a national population council and introduced family planning services into hospitals. These efforts were largely confined to urban centers and did not reach the rural, mostly indigenous population. These efforts were continued by president Alan García in the following years, along with the Church and those on the political left. While the Catholic Church supported efforts to control population growth, they disagreed with the use of modern birth control methods. Instead, they promoted "responsible parenthood" and traditional methods. Fearing backlash from the Church, the 1985 legislation chose not to attempt to legalize voluntary sterilization and abortion, much to the disappointment of Peruvian feminists.

Plan Verde 

In the 1980s, Peru was a country that had long been subordinate to an oligarchy in its society and as a result, the class divide between a handful of "powerful individuals" and the remaining "poor and impotent majority" was significant. The Peruvian armed forces, frustrated with the inability of the Alan García administration to handle the nation's crises, including the internal conflict in Peru, began to draft a plan to overthrow his government and establish a neoliberal government. According to Peruvian sociologist and political analyst Fernando Rospigliosi, Peru's business elites held relationships with the military planners, with Rospigliosi writing that businesses "probably provided the economic ideas which [the military] agreed with, the necessity of a liberal economic program as well as the installment of an authoritarian government which would impose order".

In one of the plan's volumes titled Driving Peru into the XXI century, the military planned to sterilize impoverished citizens in what Rospigliosi described as "ideas frankly similar to the Nazis", with the military writing that "the general use of sterilization processes for culturally backward and economically impoverished groups is convenient", describing these groups as "unnecessary burdens" and that "given their incorrigible character and lack of resources ... there is only their total extermination".

According to Peruvian magazine Oiga, the armed forces finalized plans on 18 June 1990 involving multiple scenarios for a coup to be executed on 27 July 1990, the day prior to the inauguration of Alberto Fujimori. The magazine noted that in one of the scenarios, titled "Negotiation and agreement with Fujimori. Bases of negotiation: concept of directed Democracy and Market Economy", Fujimori was to be directed on accepting the military's plan at least twenty-four hours before his inauguration. Rospigliosi states "an understanding was established between Fujimori, Montesinos and some of the military officers" involved in Plan Verde prior to Fujimori's inauguration. Fujimori would go on to adopt many of the policies outlined in Plan Verde.

National Population Program 

The Fujimori government, especially the offices of the presidency and prime minister, determined that sterilizations were a primary tool for economic development, revealing their intentions regarding population control. In 1991, a new National Population Program was developed by Fujimori's National Population Council. With the compliance of Fujimori, plans for a coup as designed in Plan Verde were prepared over a two-year period and finally executed during the 1992 Peruvian coup d'état, which ultimately established a civilian-military regime and began the institution of objectives presented in Plan Verde. In 1993, a National Report on Population and Development of the Fujimori government argued that the previous program was insufficient and promoted large expansions for the program. That same year, the prime minister's report titled "Basic Social Policy Guidelines" was largely influential on population policy, arguing that population projections would leave Peru unable to provide basic social services. The "Social Policy: Situation and Perspectives" document also presented that permanent birth control targeted for the poor was one of thirteen main economic recovery policies of the Fujimori administration. The Fujimori-appointed program director Eduardo Yong Motta contacted clinics weekly demanding increased quotas according to staff while Fujimori's well-known micromanaging techniques also resulted with the president even visiting regional program leaders directly to demand increased sterilizations.

Prior to the program, there were less than 15,000 sterilizations performed per year and women could only have the operation performed "if they had a health risk, four or more children, or were above a certain age". However, after 1995 when sterilizations began to be performed, there were no pre-existing conditions necessary for sterilizations other than that women had to be considered part of Peru's poor and disenfranchised community. In addition, the number of annual sterilization procedures rose after the program's implementation from 15,000 to 67,000 in 1996 and 115,000 in 1997. Most of the personnel hired to perform sterilizations were not properly trained, much of the equipment used was outdated or lacking in quality and the counseling services provided to patients were also backed by poorly trained staff, with many women not being given "quality information prior to procedures".

Fujimori utilized feminist language to manipulate the discourse surrounding family planning in Peru and placed population control at a greater importance than human rights. In total, more than 300,000 Peruvians were victims of forced sterilization in the 1990s, with the majority being affected by the National Population Program.

Analysis

Ethnic cleansing and genocide 
The plan's forced sterilization of vulnerable groups through the Programa Nacional de Población has been variably described as an ethnic cleansing or genocidal operation. According to Back and Zavala, the plan was an example of ethnic cleansing as it targeted indigenous and rural women. Jocelyn E. Getgen of Cornell University wrote that the systemic nature of sterilizations and the mens rea of officials who drafted the plan proved an act of genocide. The Centro Amazónico de Antropología y Aplicación Práctica non-profit stated that the act "was the largest genocide since [Peru's] colonization". The policy of sterilizations resulted in a generational shift that included a smaller younger generation that could not provide economic stimulation to rural areas, making such regions more impoverished.

Official Figures 
The Public Ministry determined that between 1996 and 2001, a total of 2,091 women suffered forced sterilizations, a figure that would represent less than 1% of the total sterilizations that, according to data from the Ombudsman's Office, were practiced on 272,028 people.

In the Prosecutor's Office there are 2,166 complaints for cases of non-voluntary sterilization, while 3,761 women registered in the Registry of Victims of Forced Sterilizations (Reviesfo) of the Peruvian Ministry of Justice. This body was able to identify 5,097 women who suffered sterilizations against their will.

Foreign involvement 
Population control guidelines promoted by international bodies became apparent when the International Monetary Fund called on the Peruvian government to cut social programs in order to fund population programs. According to Peru's congressional subcommittee investigations, United States Agency for International Development (USAID), the United Nations Population Fund (UNFPA) and the Nippon Foundation supported the sterilization efforts of the Fujimori government. The investigation found that as USAID funding increased for the program, more sterilizations were performed, with the investigatory board concluding that the "correlation has a causal nature, since there is information made public recently, which has revealed the global strategy defined for the last quarter of the last century by the United States government in order to obtain a decrease in the birth rate". The subcommittee cited the National Security Study Memorandum 200 and Henry Kissinger's direction to lower population growth in developing countries in order to maintain stability for United States political and economic interests. In documents provided by the Freedom of Information Act, the investigators cited E. Liagin, who reported that from 1993 to 1998, "USAID's own internal files reveal that in 1993 the US basically took over Peru's national health system" during the period of forced sterilizations, with E. Liagin concluding that it was "virtually inconceivable that sterilization abuses could have occurred in the systematic way that has been documented without the knowledge of USAID local administrators and their counterparts in Washington".

In 1998 after facing pressure following investigations by the Population Research Institute, USAID ceased funding for sterilizations in Peru. Sterilizations continued until President Fujimori fled to Japan in 2000. Following USAID's withdrawal, Fujimori contacted the Nippon Foundation – whose directors hosted Fujimori when he fled to Japan – requesting assistance with sterilization programs. The policy of sterilizations resulted in a generational shift that included a smaller younger generation that could not provide economic stimulation to rural areas, making such regions more impoverished.

Aftermath 
The International Criminal Court condemned the Fujimori government's actions, describing them as crimes against humanity. Human rights groups filed a complaint to the Inter-American Commission on Human Rights in 1999 on behalf of Mamerita Mestanza Chavez, who was intimidated into being sterilized, received no medical assistance before or after the procedure and later died as a result.

The Peruvian government, however, had little involvement with responding to the hundreds of thousands of Peruvians forcibly sterilized and has actively blocked investigations, especially when Fujimorists that led the Congress of Peru through the 2010s. In July 2016, a public prosecutor argued that Fujimori and his government staff could not face trial for sterilizations, saying that any forced sterilizations occurred in "isolated" incidents by individual medical personnel. A case against former president Alberto Fujimori involving thousands of woman plaintiffs has been on hold since 2002. Fujimori, who was already convicted and imprisoned for other crimes against humanity, was to face trial for the sterilization program under his government, though Judge Rafael Martinez blocked the trial, ruling that when Fujimori was extradited from Chile, the charges for forced sterilizations were not present in the extradition request. In order to face trial, the Supreme Court of Chile would have to authorize the prosecution of Fujimori for the forced sterilization charges.

Efforts have been led by both by citizens and the government to gain justice and further understand the impacts of the forced sterilizations. The Truth and Reconciliation Commission (TRC) was formed in 2001 with the general goal of investigating the twenty years of internal conflict between the Shining Path/rondas campesinas and the Peruvian armed forces. One specific struggle has been in defining the forced sterilizations as a form of sexual violence. Feminist and human rights organizations introduced Decree 2906 which would expand the definition of sexual violence during armed conflict to include the forced sterilizations, along with forced pregnancy, abortion, prostitution, and sex slavery. However, the Ministry of Justice heavily opposed the decree. Broadening the definition would "mean admitting that the Peruvian state was the primary perpetrator of sexual violence during the twenty-year period under investigation by the TRC - not via the armed forces but via the Ministry of Health." Decree 2906 was passed in 2012,  expanding the reparable categories of sexual violence, but still excluded the sterilization campaign.

References

External Links 

 "Peru forced sterilisations case reaches key stage" - BBC News

1991 establishments in Peru
Anti-indigenous racism in South America
Class discrimination
Compulsory sterilization
Demographics of Peru
Fujimorism
Genocide of indigenous peoples of South America
Government of Peru
Human rights abuses in Peru
Sterilization (medicine)